Glenn Rosenstein is an American record producer, engineer, sound mixer and guitarist based in Muscle Shoals, AL, who engineered and produced many albums including the Grammy-winning  One Bright Day by Ziggy Marley. Rosenstein worked at New York City's Sigma Sound Studios in the 1980s. He owns and runs Skylight Studio.

Biography 
Rosenstein started as a guitarist but, having "quickly learned in a very competitive NYC market that [he] was average at best", moved to music production, his first job being a part-time receptionist at The Power Station. As a producer, mixer, and engineer, his projects have won three Grammy Awards, garnered five Grammy nominations and won both an Oscar and a Golden Globe award.

Selected discography

Producer 
 Last Alaska Moon by Livingston Taylor released by Coconut Bay, a division of Chesky Records, in 2010
 There You Are Again by American singer-songwriter Livingston Taylor released by Whistling Dog Music in January 2006
 Between the Dreaming and the Coming True by contemporary Christian musician, Bebo Norman on Essential Records released on September 19, 2006
 Clear to Venus by American singer-songwriter Andrew Peterson, released in 2001
 The Best of Plumb by Christian singer Plumb which features 15 previously released songs, including three remixes, 2000
 Carried Along by American singer-songwriter Andrew Peterson, released in 2000
 I Bificus by singer/songwriter Bif Naked, released in 1998
 40 Acres, the 1999 release from Caedmon's Call
 candycoatedwaterdrops by Christian singer Plumb released in 1999
 Wake by Emmet Swimming released twice; first as an independent releaseand later as an Epic Records release. The 1994 Screaming Goddess Music release differs from the Epic Records re-release of wake.
 Jahmekya  by Ziggy Marley and the Melody Makers 1991 Engineer 
 Conscious Party by Ziggy Marley & The Melody Makers', released in 1988
 Spanish Fly, 1987 album by Lisa Lisa and Cult Jam, best known for the singles "Head to Toe" and "Lost in Emotion," both of which reached number one in the United States. The album was a commercial success, reaching No. 7 on the Billboard 200 and going Platinum.

 Musician 
 Boom Boom Chi Boom Boom'' by Tom Tom Club released in 1988, rhythm guitar on "Born for Love", keyboards on "She Belongs to Me"

References

External links 
 Official website

Year of birth missing (living people)
Living people
American record producers